Fredrik Djurling, born 1981 in Järfälla is a Swedish former floorball player, having played for AIK Innebandy and the national team of Sweden until his retirement in 2011. He grew up in Järfälla, Sweden and played for Järfälla IBK until April 2007 when he signed up for the Swedish team AIK Innebandy. He won the World Cup in 2006.

References 

Swedish floorball players
1981 births
Living people
Järfälla IBK players
AIK Innebandy players
21st-century Swedish people